Deir Sharaf is a Palestinian town in the Nablus Governorate in northern West Bank, located northwest of Nablus. According to the Palestinian Central Bureau of Statistics (PCBS), the town had a population of 2,759 inhabitants in mid-year 2006.

Location
It is bordered by An Naqura, Beit Iba, and Sabastiya to the east, Burqa and  Ramin to the north, Beit Lid to the west, and Qusin  to the south.

History
Pottery sherds from the Iron Age II,  Byzantine, early Muslim and Medieval era have been found here.

Ottoman era
Deir Sharaf, like the rest of Palestine, was incorporated into the Ottoman Empire in 1517, and in the  census of 1596 it was a part of the nahiya ("subdistrict") of Jabal Sami, which was part of the Sanjak of Nablus. The village had a population of 55 households, all Muslim. The villagers  paid a fixed tax rate of 33.3% on  wheat, barley, summer crops, olive trees, beehives and/or goats, in addition to occasional revenues, a press for olive oil or grape syrup, and a tax on Muslims in the Nablus area; a total of 9,372 akçe. The whole of the revenue went to a Waqf for the Madrasa of Ramla.

In 1838, Deir Sheraf was located in the Wady esh-Sha'ir District, west of Nablus.

In 1870, Victor Guérin noted “a small square in front of the mosque paved by ancient slabs” in the village, which he called Deir Ech-Cheraf.

In 1882, the PEF's Survey of Western Palestine described  Deir Sheraf: "A village of small size, situate[d] in a hollow. Above it, beside the road on the east, is a good spring, apparently perennial, and round this are vegetable gardens irrigated with its waters. Figs and olives also grow in the vicinity."

British Mandate era

In the 1922 census of Palestine, conducted by the British Mandate authorities, Deir Sharaf had a population of 487, all Muslims,  increasing in the 1931 census to  572, still all Muslim, in a total of 118 houses.

In the 1945 statistics, Deir Sharaf had a population of 800, all Muslims,  with 7,190  dunams of land, according to an official land and population survey. Of this, 391 dunams were for plantations and irrigable land, 4,335 used for cereals, while 71 dunams were built-up (urban) land.

Jordanian era
In the wake of the 1948 Arab–Israeli War Deir Sharaf came under Jordanian rule.

The Jordanian census of 1961 found 1,241 inhabitants in Deir Sharaf.

Post-1967
Since the Six-Day War in 1967, Deir Sharaf has been under  Israeli occupation. The population in the 1967 census conducted by Israel was 973, of whom 46 originated from the Israeli territory.

After the 1995 accords, 23% of village land was classified as Area B, the remaining 77% as Area C. 236 dunams Deir Sharaf’s land has been confiscated by the Israel for the Israeli settlement of Shavei Shomron, located just north of Deir Sharaf.

On 3 July 2014, Israeli authorities stated that they were confiscating 16 dunams of land near the village for “military purposes”.

References

Bibliography

External links
  Welcome to Dayr Sharaf
Deir Sharaf, Welcome to Palestine
Survey of Western Palestine, Map 11:    IAA, Wikimedia commons
  Deir Sharaf village profile,   Applied Research Institute–Jerusalem (ARIJ) 
  Dayr Sharaf aerial photo, ARIJ
 Development Priorities and Needs in Deir Sharaf, ARIJ

Nablus Governorate
Villages in the West Bank
Municipalities of the State of Palestine